The Keweenaw Brewing Company (KBC) is a craft brewer with a taproom in Houghton and a production facility in nearby South Range, Michigan. It is named for the Keweenaw Peninsula, which projects out to the north of Michigan's Upper Peninsula.

Established in 2004, Keweenaw is the largest brewer in the Upper Peninsula; their products are sold there and in the nearby states/regions of Minnesota, Wisconsin, and Michigan's Lower Peninsula. Their taproom looks out over the Keweenaw Waterway and Copper Island, and their best-known beer is the Widow Maker Black Ale.

History 
The Keweenaw Brewing Company opened in 2004. It was founded by Paul Boissevain and Richard Grey, who previously worked at the same oil company in Denver, Colorado, and lost their jobs around the same time. Keweenaw was the second modern microbrewery in the Upper Peninsula, after Hereford & Hops Steakhouse and Brewpub, and opened over three decades after Houghton's last brewery (Bosch) closed in 1973.

Located on Shelden Street in Houghton's downtown, Keweenaw quickly became financially successful. In the first year after opening, the brewery brewed 400 barrels of beer and took over a storefront next door. In the following year, they brewed 1,100 barrels, and within three years of opening, they added a deck with parking options and were producing 2,000 barrels.

In 2007, the brewpub expanded its production capabilities by purchasing a warehouse in South Range, Michigan, located just to the south of Houghton, and installing brewing and canning equipment within it. They began canning their beer that same year, putting Keweenaw in the vanguard of widespread canning of craft beer in the United States. , the brewery sold its products in Minnesota, Wisconsin, and Michigan's Upper and Lower Peninsulas.

Keweenaw canned their one thousandth batch of beer in March 2018, and in the same year the brewing company signed a deal with Comerica Park, the stadium that hosts baseball's Detroit Tigers, to distribute their beer. During the COVID-19 pandemic in 2020, Keweenaw Brewing Company was awarded $15,000 from the Pure Michigan Small Business Relief Initiative.

Production 
In 2016, Keweenaw sold 9,801 barrels of beer within Michigan. This increased to 10,469 barrels in 2017, and 11,349 barrels in 2018, a total that made it the ninth-largest brewer in the state and the largest brewer in the Upper Peninsula. Growth slowed after 2018; Keweenaw had a total production volume of about 11,800 barrels in 2021. However, due to production decreases at other breweries, this total made Keweenaw the sixth-largest brewer in the state and the largest in the Upper Peninsula, topping Blackrocks Brewery by about 1,800 barrels.

Location 
, the interior space at Keweenaw's Houghton brewpub measured  and contained two bars and a fireplace. The exterior deck looks out over the Keweenaw Waterway, which separates Houghton from the city of Hancock and the rest of Copper Island. , all of the taproom's employees were students at nearby Michigan Technological University, and the brewery's existence was used as a selling point in attracting employees to the college.

Recognition and beer 
In 2015, U.S. News & World Report named Keweenaw as one of the best breweries in the Midwestern United States. Other craft brewers in the region, such as the founders of Blackrocks Brewery in nearby Marquette, have credited Keweenaw's early work and success with (in their words) "really clear[ing] a lot of brush for the breweries to come afterwards."

, the most popular beer sold by the Keweenaw Brewing Company is Widow Maker Black Ale, whose name stems from a dangerous one-person drill once used in service of the region's extensive copper mining. They started canning the beer in 2009. Their other so-called "core" beers include Pick Axe Blonde and Red Jacket Amber.

See also 
Blackrocks Brewery
Ore Dock Brewing Company
Alpha Michigan Brewing Company

Footnotes

Endnotes

References

External links 
Official website

2004 establishments in Michigan
Companies based in Houghton, Michigan
Beer brewing companies based in the Upper Peninsula of Michigan
American companies established in 2004